In various countries, objects have been thrown at politicians for reasons varying from comedic to harmful.

Australia
On November 29, 1917, Prime Minister Billy Hughes had an egg thrown at him at the Warwick railway station in Queensland.
On March 11, 1993, Liberal leader John Hewson was pelted with eggs, soft drink cans, apples, tomatoes and broccoli during a rally in front of Brisbane city hall, with Hewson catching one of the eggs.
On October 25, 2010, two shoes were thrown at John Howard, former Prime Minister, by Peter Gray, live on the ABC Television program Q&A while Howard was defending his decision to commit Australian troops to the 2003 invasion of Iraq.
On November 4, 2010, John Howard was delivering a speech about leadership in the new century at Cambridge University when an Australian student called him a racist before taking off his boot and throwing it in his direction.
On June 14, 2015, David Sprigg threw his shoes at Australian Immigration Minister Peter Dutton in Brisbane, later saying, "I think he should be ashamed for what his government is doing and how asylum seekers are being treated in detention centres. When they use language like 'queue jumpers' and 'illegal arrivals', I think they're really just turning the public against refugees."
On March 16, 2019, Senator Fraser Anning had an egg cracked on the back of his head by a teenager due to him blaming Muslim immigrants for the Christchurch mosque shootings.
On May 6, 2019, a woman attempted to egg Prime Minister Scott Morrison while he was campaigning for the 2019 election, but it bounced off his head.

Belgium 

 On June 17, 2013, State Secretary for Asylum and Migration Maggie De Block was hit in the face with plates carrying whipped cream and ketchup by two activists. They responded to her immigration policy labeling it "fascist, destructive and inhumane".
 On December 22, 2014, Prime Minister Charles Michel was attacked with French fries and mayonnaise by two masked members of Lilith, an international feminist activist group. They were protesting financial cuts. A packet of French fries was first thrown over the prime minister and was immediately followed by several squirts of mayo.

Canada
On June 3, 1976, former Minister of Agriculture Eugene Whelan was hit on the head with a milk jug during a demonstration by dairy farmers.
On August 20, 1982, rocks, eggs, and tomatoes were thrown on a train that then-Prime Minister Pierre Trudeau was riding on, resulting in a broken window.
On May 7, 1999, former Liberal Party leader Stéphane Dion was hit by a pie.
On August 16, 2000, then-Prime Minister Jean Chrétien was pied in Charlottetown by a member of the PEI Pie Brigade.
On October 5, 2000, Canadian Alliance leader Stockwell Day was hit with chocolate milk in Kitchener.
On April 12, 2003, former Quebec Premier Jean Charest had two pies thrown at him during an election campaign.
On July 5, 2003, Alberta Premier Ralph Klein was hit in the face with a banana cream pie at the Calgary Stampede.
On July 25, 2010, Klein's successor, Ed Stelmach, was targeted in a pieing incident, but a member of his security detail took the pie for him.
On January 25, 2010, Fisheries Minister Gail Shea was pied by someone protesting the seal hunt.
On June 15, 2013, a cup of juice was thrown in the face of then-Toronto Mayor Rob Ford at the Taste of Little Italy festival.
On September 27, 2019, an egg was thrown at Prime Minister Justin Trudeau at the Montreal Climate Strike.
On September 2, 2021, an egg was thrown at People's Party of Canada leader Maxime Bernier during a campaign event in Saskatoon.
On September 6, 2021, Prime Minister Justin Trudeau had gravel thrown at him while he boarded his campaign bus after a rally.

France
On February 1, 2012, François Hollande was flour bombed while campaigning for the presidential election in protest of the Socialist Party.
On June 6, 2016, Economy Minister Emmanuel Macron was egged by General Confederation of Labour activists protesting labor reforms.
On December 22, 2016, former Prime Minister Manuel Valls was flour bombed after announcing that he was running in the presidential election in protest of his multiple uses of Article 49.
On April 6, 2017, former Prime Minister François Fillon was flour bombed at a campaign rally in protest of his corruption.
On September 27, 2021, President Emmanuel Macron was hit on the shoulder by an egg during a food trade fair in Lyon.
On April 27, 2022, a tomato missed President Emmanuel Macron during a visit to a working-class area of Paris.

Greece
Since the 1950s protesters have thrown yogurt, referred to as "yaourtoma", at politicians and in 1958 doing so was criminalized until 1983. Alekos Alavanos, Liana Kanelli, and Haris Kastanidis have had yogurt thrown at them.

Guatemala
Vice President Roxana Baldetti was covered in flour after a speech in Guatemala City in 2014.

Hong Kong 

 In 2008, Hong Kong politician Raymond Wong Yuk-man threw a bunch of bananas at Chief Executive Donald Tsang in protest of plans to introduce a means test for Old Age Allowance payments (colloquially known as "fruit money").
 In 2013, a protester threw a stuffed wolf toy at Leung Chun-ying, as both a criticism of his perceived cunningness, and as a pun on his name and the Chinese word for wolf (the transliterated name given to the stuffed toy by IKEA also sounds similar to a Cantonese profanity).
 People have also thrown dorayaki at lawmakers in the past, as an accusation of lying (the fictional character Doraemon uses dorayaki to get people to tell the truth).

Ireland
In April 2002, Fine Gael leader Michael Noonan was hit in the face with a custard pie while canvassing in Roscommon.
In November 2010, health minister Mary Harney had red paint thrown at her by a city councillor from Dublin.
In November 2012, protesters at University College Dublin threw eggs at Fine Gael leader and Taoiseach Enda Kenny, while he was attending the opening of a student centre in the college. The eggs missed Kenny.
In September 2019, leader of the National Party Justin Barrett had a milkshake thrown at him in Eyre Square, Galway.
In September 2020, Tánaiste and Fine Gael leader Leo Varadkar had a drink thrown at him by a woman in Merrion Park, Dublin.

Italy
In 63, Vespasian, the Roman Governor of Africa, had turnips thrown at him.
In 2009, a souvenir cathedral was thrown at Prime Minister Silvio Berlusconi causing damage to his nose and teeth.

New Zealand
Queen Elizabeth II was egged by two Maori protestors on February 24, 1986 while riding in an open car with Prince Philip. 
On February 6, 1990, Queen Elizabeth II was almost hit by a wet t-shirt during Waitangi Day ceremonies, thrown by Maori student Henearoahuea Tepou.
On February 5, 2004, a handful of mud was thrown at New Zealand National Party leader Don Brash, hitting him in the face and upper chest. The thrower, later identified as Kevin Raymond Duncan, was charged with disorderly conduct. This charge was later withdrawn.  
Also on February 5, 2016, New Zealand MP and Minister of Economic Development Steven Joyce was struck with a thrown dildo in Waitangi. The act was in protest of the Trans-Pacific Partnership.

Sri Lanka
On January 30, 2022 Leader of the Janatha Vimukthi Peramuna and National People's Power Anura Kumara Dissanayake's vehicle was egged by two men who are working for the Avant-garde Security Service which is running by President Gotabaya Rajapaksa's very close friend Nissanka Senadhipathi.

United Kingdom

1970s
On June 1, 1970, Prime Minister Harold Wilson was egged by a member of the Young Conservatives while campaigning for the 1970 general election.

2000s
On May 16, 2001, Deputy Prime Minister John Prescott was egged.
In 2004, Prime Minister Tony Blair had purple-coloured powder thrown at him while debating in the House of Commons.
In 2009, First Secretary of State Peter Mandelson had green custard thrown at him by Leila Deen, a member of Plane Stupid.

2010s
On 21 April 2010, a teenager threw an egg at Conservative Party leader David Cameron. The teenager was detained but was released once police determined he had no other missiles.
In 2012 and 2013, Labour Party leader Ed Miliband had eggs thrown at him.
An egg was thrown at Nigel Farage in 2017, but it hit his umbrella.
In March 2019, Labour Party leader Jeremy Corbyn had an egg thrown at him.
During the 2019 European Parliament election multiple politicians from the UK Independence Party and the Brexit Party, including Carl Benjamin, Nigel Farage, and Tommy Robinson, had milkshakes thrown at them.

United States

1910s

On August 14, 1908, Eugene W. Chafin was giving a speech in Springfield, Illinois, when a lynch mob started a riot and while he was taking his handkerchief out from his pocket a member of the mob believed that he was pulling a gun out and threw a brick at him.
A cabbage was thrown at William Howard Taft while campaigning by a heckler. Taft responded: "I see that one of my opponents has lost its head."

1950s

In 1958, Vice President Richard Nixon conducted a goodwill tour throughout multiple South American countries. Protesters in Lima, Peru threw eggs at his motorcade, and on May 13, 1958, his motorcade was attacked by protesters in Caracas, Venezuela in response to the United States's support for the recently deposed dictator Marcos Pérez Jiménez.

1960s
On October 28, 1960, Vice President Richard Nixon was egged in Muskegon and Jackson, Michigan, and had tomatoes thrown at him in Grand Rapids while campaigning in the 1960 presidential election.

1970s

On November 8, 1979, Senator Ted Kennedy was traveling to a senior citizen's center in Chicago during his campaign for the 1980 Democratic Party presidential primaries and while doing so was being picketed by anti-abortion activists. Katie Moy, a member of the Communist Workers' Party, threw an egg at Kennedy in protest of the Greensboro massacre, but it only hit his shoulder before breaking on the ground.

1990s

In 1998, members of the Biotic Baking Brigade threw pies at San Francisco Mayor Willie Brown during a speech in protest of his policies on homelessness.

2000s
In 2000, a vegetarian activist threw a pie at Secretary of Agriculture Dan Glickman at the National Nutrition Summit in protest of his promotion of meat products.
In 2000, Illinois Governor George Ryan was pied by a student from the Southern Illinois University Carbondale in protest of his education policies.
In 2001, when exiting an antique store in Warsaw, Poland, former President Bill Clinton had an egg thrown at him by a protester.
In 2003, former presidential candidate Ralph Nader was giving his endorsement to the Green Party's gubernatorial candidate, Peter Camejo, for the gubernatorial recall election in San Francisco and during his speech he was pied in the face by an unknown assailant.
In 2003, Arnold Schwarzenegger was egged while campaigning for governor of California. He later made a quip about the incident, and described the action as part of free speech. 
On October 21, 2004, Ann Coulter was pied by Phillip Edgar Smith and William Zachary Wolff in the name of "Al Pieda" (a pun on Al Qaeda) while giving a speech at the University of Arizona.
On March 30, 2005, Bill Kristol was pied by a student while giving a foreign policy speech at Earlham College. The student stated that they were "making a statement about what he called a mock dialog".
On April 1, 2005, Pat Buchanan had salad dressing thrown onto him while speaking at Western Michigan University.
On May 10, 2005, Vladimir Arutyunian threw a hand grenade at Georgian President Mikheil Saakashvili and President George W. Bush at Freedom Square in Tbilisi, Georgia, but the grenade did not detonate.
On November 7, 2005, an individual threw a cup of ice cubes at California Governor Arnold Schwarzenegger in Chico, with several ice cubes landing on Schwarzenegger, who did not react. Shortly after, a woman crushed a muffin in her hand and threw it at Schwarzenegger.
On July 4, 2008, Vermont Governor Jim Douglas was pied in the face by a man dressed as Santa Claus in protest of his energy policies.
On December 14, 2008, journalist Muntadhar al-Zaidi threw his shoes at President George W. Bush during a press conference with Prime Minister Nouri al-Maliki in Baghdad, Iraq, but Bush ducked below both.
In 2009, multiple eggs were thrown at Senator Norm Coleman by a man at his door, but all of them missed.
In 2009, Jeremy Paul Olsen attempted to hit Governor Sarah Palin with two tomatoes from a second-floor balcony, but both missed.

2010s

In 2010, a paperback book was thrown at President Barack Obama by the book's author hoping that the president would read it.
On August 16, 2010, Senator Carl Levin, a Jewish member of Congress, was pied in the face by Ahlam Mohsem to "bring to light Sen[ator] Levin's war crimes" as a "Zionist".
On May 17, 2011, Newt Gingrich and his wife Callista Gingrich were glitter bombed by Nick Espinosa who shouted "Stop the hate!" and "Feel the rainbow, Newt!"
On June 16, 2011, former Minnesota Governor Tim Pawlenty was glitter bombed by members of Code Pink.
On June 18, 2011, Representative Michele Bachmann was glitter bombed by Rachel E. B. Lang with the support of GetEQUAL and COLAGE due to Bachmann's support for You Can Run But You Cannot Hide International.
On December 19, 2011, Randall Terry was glitter bombed by Vermin Supreme at the lesser-known candidates forum at Saint Anselm College.
In 2012, Secretary of State Hillary Clinton's motorcade had tomatoes and shoes thrown at it in Alexandria, Egypt and there were shouts of "Monica, Monica" and "leave, Clinton".
Former Senator Rick Santorum was glitter bombed by protesters five separate times in 2012.
On February 6, 2012, Representative Ron Paul was glitter bombed by a protester who shouted "Housing and health care are human rights, not privileges!" while Paul was campaigning for the 2012 Republican Party presidential primaries.
On February 1 and February 7, 2012, former Massachusetts Governor Mitt Romney was glitter bombed by protesters.
In 2014 a woman threw her shoe at Hillary Clinton during a speaking tour in Las Vegas.
On September 21, 2016, Kevin Johnson, the Mayor of Sacramento, was pied by Sean Thompson at a charity event. Johnson punched Thompson, who was later arrested on felony and misdemeanor charges.
On February 17, 2017, a middle school student threw a block of wood at President Donald Trump's motorcade in Palm Beach, Florida.
On June 1, 2019, a woman threw a drink at Representative Matt Gaetz as he left a restaurant in Pensacola, Florida. The woman, who had previously run against Gaetz in the 2016 House election, was sentenced to 15 days in federal prison.

2020s
On June 17, 2021, a man threw a water bottle at California Governor Gavin Newsom in Downtown Oakland.
On September 8, 2021, radio show host running for the governorship of California, Larry Elder was egged by a woman on a bike wearing a Gorilla mask in Venice, Los Angeles.
On May 20, 2022, New York City Mayor Eric Adams had a protein drink can thrown at him, hitting one of his security guards.
On November 7, 2022, a man was arrested for throwing a hard seltzer can at Senator Ted Cruz during a World Series parade in Downtown Houston, Texas.

Venezuela
In 2015 president Nicolas Maduro was hit in the head with a mango with a written message on it while visiting Anzoategui.

See also
Glitter bombing
List of shoe-throwing incidents
Pieing

References

Objects Being Thrown
Objects being thrown